Events in the year 2019 in Tunisia.

Incumbents
 President: Kais Saied
 Prime Minister: Youssef Chahed
 President of the Assembly of the Representatives by the People: Rached Ghannouchi

Events

June 
 June 27 – Suicide Bombing in Tunis, Tunisia

July 
 July 5 – Tunisia bans the burqa.

September 
 September 15 – The first round of the 2019 Tunisian presidential election is held

October 
 October 6 – The 2019 Tunisian parliamentary election are held and Ennahdha Movement wins with 52 seats in the Assembly of the Representatives of the People
 October 13 – The second round of the 2019 Tunisian presidential election is held and Kais Saied wins
 October 21 – Former Professor Kais Saied becomes President of Tunisia

Deaths

20 January – Mustapha Filali, politician (b. 1921).
31 March – Hedi Turki, painter (b. 1922).
25 July - Beji Caid Essebsi incumbent president Sebsi.
15 September 2019 — Chadlia Caid Essebsi (b. 1936), 83, Tunisian consort, First Lady (2014–2019), heart attack.          
 September 19 – Zine El Abidine Ben Ali, 14th Prime Minister and 2nd President of Tunisia (b. 1936)

References

 
Tunisia
2010s in Tunisia
Years of the 21st century in Tunisia
Tunisia